Art the Clown is a fictional character from the Terrifier franchise and related media. Created by writer and director Damien Leone, Art first appeared in low-budget short films before making his feature film debut in the anthology film All Hallows' Eve (2013). The character is the main antagonist of Terrifier (2016) and Terrifier 2 (2022). Mike Giannelli portrayed the character initially until David Howard Thornton signed on for the role. 

Originally appearing as a minor character in Leone's The 9th Circle (2008), he decided to develop more short films featuring the character after receiving positive feedback from audiences. Art obtained significant media attention following the critical and box office success of Terrifier 2. Art has a sidekick in the form of the clown-dressed The Little Pale Girl (Amelie McLain), as well as enemies in the form of final girls Victoria Heyes (Samantha Scaffidi) and Sienna Shaw (Lauren LaVera).

Appearances

Film
The character made his debut appearance in the 2008 short film The 9th Circle which follows his pursuit of a young woman named Casey (Kayla Lian) in an empty train station on Halloween night. Merely a supporting character in this film, Art abducts Casey and brings her to a satanic cult to be sacrificed. Art made his next appearance in the 2011 short film Terrifier, where he stalks and torments a young woman who witnesses one of his previous murders. 
The character made his feature-film debut in All Hallows' Eve (2013) which incorporates the prior two short films as segments on VHS tapes that Sarah (Katie Maguire) watches with the children she's babysitting on Halloween night. Art enters the real world and murders the children for a terrified Sarah to find.

In Terrifier (2016), on Halloween night, Art fills a garbage bag with a variety of weapons and begins wandering the streets of Miles County. He stumbles across the drunken Tara Heyes (Jenna Kanell) and Dawn (Catherine Corcoran), the latter of whom provokes him. He slashes Dawn's tires and follows them into a nearby pizzeria and finds himself fixated on the distraught Tara. He murders the two girls and anyone in his path. He later begins a hunt for Tara's older sister Victoria Heyes (Samantha Scaffidi). After running her over with a car, he partially eats her face and commits suicide upon police confrontation, leaving her severely mutilated. In the final scene, he is resurrected in the morgue by an unknown force and promptly murders the coroner.

In Terrifier 2 (2022), following the mutilation of Victoria and his suicide, Art has become an urban legend in Miles County due to his body disappearing from the morgue after being resurrected by a sinister entity. The sinister entity that revives him takes the form of his first victim, a little girl he killed at a carnival years before, wearing the same clown makeup as him and is completely mute as well, acting as his partner-in-crime throughout the film. Only Art and certain people can see her. A year later, Art begins another killing spree on Halloween, while hunting down the teenager Sienna Shaw (Lauren LaVera) and her younger brother Jonathan (Elliot Fullam), whose late father knew about Art and his secrets. He tries to kill Sienna with a sword from her father, but it only heals her wounds, and she uses it to decapitate Art. Eventually, Victoria, now in a mental hospital, gives birth to his still alive severed head.

Literature
Art is set to return in the comic book retelling of the 2016 film.

Creation and portrayal

Leone wanted to create a clown character based on iconic slasher film villains, but wanted him to be the complete opposite of Pennywise from It (1990), being devoid of color and speech.
Art first appeared in Leone's short film The Ninth Circle (2008). Although he was only a minor character, viewers found him particularly memorable, prompting Leone to make the short film Terrifier (2011), centered on Art. He wanted to create a feature film about the character, but put the idea on hold when producers approached him to feature his short films as segments in the anthology All Hallows' Eve, with Art as the thread connecting all the segments.

In the short films featuring him, and in All Hallow's Eve, Art was played by Mike Giannelli. When Leone began developing a feature film based on Art, Giannelli decided to retire from acting. When David Howard Thornton submitted an audition tape, he was cast as the murderous villain and is set to portray him in future installments. Thornton says his performance was inspired by classic physical comedians like Charlie Chaplin and 
famous horror villains like Robert Englund's Freddy Krueger and Tim Curry's Pennywise, but that his main inspiration came from the various portrayals of the iconic supervillain the Joker.

Reception
In a positive review for the magazine Starburst, Sol Harris wrote "Art is a truly enigmatic and memorable villain. He frequently veers into the territory of being genuinely unpleasant to watch, which makes him feel somewhat separate from the stable of horror icons such as Freddy Krueger and Chucky. Special acknowledgement should be given to David Howard Thornton for a truly wonderful performance and one that easily stands toe-to-toe with the likes of Curry and Skarsgård." In a more middling review, the blog Film School Rejects praised Thornton's portrayal and use of body language but panned Terrifier and deemed the character a misogynist with a deep hatred for women.

Popular culture
In 2018, apparel company Terror Threads released an ugly Christmas sweater of the character. American rapper and singer Ghostemane cites the character as influence for his studio album ANTI-ICON (2020).

References

Further reading
 [Interview] David Howard Thornton Teases 'Terrifier 2' and Says Script for 'Terrifier 3' is Already Underway - Bloody Disgusting
 Interview: Director Damien Leone Discusses the Guts Behind Terrifier - Dread Central
 Interview with David Thornton (Art the Clown) - Morbidly Beautiful
 “TERRIFIER”: Meet The Man Inside The Clown

Male horror film villains
Slasher film antagonists
Film characters introduced in 2008
Fictional characters with death or rebirth abilities
Fictional characters with superhuman strength
Fictional characters who can teleport
Fictional attempted suicides
Fictional clowns
Fictional demons and devils
Fictional cannibals
Fictional kidnappers
Fictional murderers of children
Fictional mass murderers
Fictional rampage and spree killers
Fictional serial killers
Fictional stalkers
Fictional monsters
Fictional mute characters
Fictional torturers
Film supervillains